Iparretarrak (meaning "the Northerners" in Basque), commonly known as IK, was a Basque nationalist paramilitary organization operating in the Northern Basque Country, founded in 1973 by Philippe Bidart and other Basque activists. To date, 1982 remains as their most active year, with 32 attacks; despite having mostly targeted tourist developments, it has also assassinated a number of French police personnel. In 1984, they attacked the Biarritz airport before the arrival of the French president François Mitterrand, who was accused by IK of "not respecting the Basque culture and national rights".

Despite sharing the same goals and methods, it held an uneasy relation with ETA, a more powerful organization based in the Southern Basque Country, mostly because ETA has used Iparralde as a hideout and did not want to provoke the French Government in this regard.

In 1998 it declared a unilateral truce, which broke when in 2000 it attacked a police station in Lecumberry and a tourism site in Bayonne. To date, it has not claimed any more actions, but another group, Irrintzi (probably numbering no more than one cell), followed IK's path in the French Basque Country by starting an on-off campaign against tourist targets.

In 2007 the leader and founder of IK Philippe Bidart was set free after serving prison since 1988.

IK members Killed in Action (KIA) 
 Txomin Olhagarai (1980)
 Ramuntxo Arruiz (1980)
 Didier Laffite (1984)
 Maddi Hegi (1987)
 Cristophe Isteke (1987)
 Jean Louis Larre, Popo (disappeared since 1983)

See also 
 Politics of France
 Terrorism

Bibliography 

 Iparretarrak Histoire d'une organisation politique armée, Eneko Bidegain, 2007, Gatuzain, .

External links 

 IK's declaration of 1997 

Paramilitary organizations based in France
Basque politics
Politics of France
Clandestine groups
Separatism in France